The Miladinov brothers (Bratya Miladinovi, Brakja Miladinovci), Dimitar Miladinov (1810–1862) and Konstantin Miladinov (1830–1862), were Bulgarian poets, folklorists, and activists of the Bulgarian national movement in Ottoman Macedonia. They are best known for their collection of folk songs called Bulgarian Folk Songs, considered to be the greatest of their contributions to Bulgarian literature and the genesis of folklore studies during the Bulgarian National Revival. Their third brother Naum (1817-1897) helped compile this collection too. Konstantin Miladinov is also famous for his poem Taga za Yug (Grief for the South) which he wrote during his stay in Russia.

In North Macedonia the Miladinov brothers are celebrated as Macedonians who laid the foundation of the Macedonian national awakening and literary tradition. Many of the Miladinov brothers' original works have been unavailable to the general public and only censored versions, and redacted copies of them have been published there.

The Miladinov brothers' hometown of Struga hosts the international Struga Poetry Evenings festival in their honour including a poetry award named after them.

Dimitar Miladinov 

Dimitar Miladinov was born around 1810 in the town of Struga, then in the Ottoman Empire, today in North Macedonia, in the family of a potter named Hristo Miladinov and his wife, Sultana. Dimitar was the eldest of eight children, six boys and two girls.

Young Dimitar was sent by his father to the Monastery of Saint Naum on Lake Ohrid, to receive basic education. Having spent four years at the monastery, at the age of twelve he continued his education in a Greek school in the town of Ohrid. Shortly after graduating as an outstanding student around 1830, he was invited by the citizens and spent two years teaching in the same school. Following the death of his father and the birth of his youngest brother Konstantin, Dimitar worked briefly as a bookkeeper in the trade chamber of the town of Durrës, today in Albania.  From 1833 to 1836 he studied in Ioannina, in what was considered to be one of the best Greek high schools, where he mastered the Greek language. After graduating, Dimitar returned to Ohrid and continued teaching.

As a teacher, in 1836 Dimitar introduced the Bell-Lancaster method and expanded the school curriculum, adding philosophy, arithmetics, geography, Old Greek, Greek literature, Latin and French. He quickly became popular and respected among his students and peers. After two years, he left Ohrid and returned to Struga. From 1840 to 1842 he was a teacher in Kukush, today in Greece. He became active in the town's social life, strongly opposing the phanariotes. At the instigation of Dimitar Miladinov, and with the full approval of the city fathers, in 1858 the use of the Greek language was banished from the churches and substituted with the Church Slavonic. In 1859, when hearing that the town of Ohrid had officially demanded from the Ottoman government the restoration of the Bulgarian Patriarchate, Dimitar left Kukush and headed for Ohrid to help. There, he translated Bible texts in Bulgarian. Dimitar tried to introduce the Bulgarian language into the Greek school in Prilep in 1856, causing an angry reaction from the local Grecomans. In a letter to "Tsarigradski Vestnik" of February 28, 1860, he reports: "…In the entire county of Ohrid, there is not a single Greek family except three or four villages of Vlahs. The rest of the population is purely Bulgarian.…" As a result of his endeavors, the Greek Bishop Miletos denounced Miladinov as a Russian agent. He was accused of spreading pan-Slavic ideas and was imprisoned in Istanbul, later to be joined by his supporting brother Konstantin. In January 1862, both brothers died in prison from typhus.

Dimitar's daughter Tsarevna Miladinova continued his Bulgarian nationalist efforts, co-founding the Bulgarian Girls' High School of Thessaloniki in 1882.

Konstantin Miladinov 

Konstantin Miladinov was the youngest son in the family of the potter Hristo Miladinov. He was born in 1830 in Struga. He studied in a few different places throughout his life but the very first teacher was his older brother Dimitar. After his graduation from the Hellenic Institute at Ioannina and the University of Athens, where he studied literature, at the instigation of his brother, Dimitar, and following the example of many young Bulgarians of that period, in 1856, Konstantin went to Russia. Reaching Odessa, and short of money, the  Bulgarian Society in that city financed his trip to Moscow. Konstantin enrolled at the Moscow University to study Slavic philology. While at the University of Athens, he was exposed, exclusively, to the teachings and thinking of ancient and modern Greek scholars. In Moscow, he came in contact with prominent Slavic writers and intellectuals, scarcely mentioned in any of the Greek textbooks. But while in Moscow he could not suppress his desire to see the River Volga. At the time of his youth, the universal belief was that the Bulgars had camped on the banks of the legendary river, had crossed it on their way to the Balkans and the origin of the name Bulgarians had come from the Russian River - Volga. Reaching its shores, Konstantin stood before it in awe, fascinated, unable to utter a word, his eyes following the flowing waters. A poet at heart, he poured his exaltations in a letter to one of his friends: "…O,Volga, Volga! What memories you awake in me, how you drive me to bury myself in the past! High are your waters, Volga. I and my friend, also a Bulgarian, we dived and proudly told ourselves that, at this very moment, we received our true baptismal.…" While in Russia he helped his older brother Dimitar in editing the materials for the collection of Bulgarian songs, that have been collected by Dimitar in his field work. The collection was subsequently published in Croatia with the support of the bishop Josip  Strosmayer, who was one of the patrons of Slavonic literature at that time. Konstantin established contact with Josip Juraj Strossmayer and early in 1860, when he heard that the Bishop would be in Vienna, he left Moscow and headed for the Austrian capital to meet his future benefactor. Very glad that he printed the book, on the way back he received the bad news that his brother was jailed. With the thought of helping his brother, he went in Tsarigrad. Denounced by the Ecumenical Patriarch of Constantinople as a dangerous Russian agent, he was arrested. It is not clear whether he was placed in the same cell with his brother, or whether the two brothers saw each other. Very soon both of them became ill and in a matter of few days died.

Naum Miladinov 

Naum Miladinov was the brother of Dimitar and Konstantin. He was born in 1817 and finished primary school in Struga. Later he went with his brother Dimitar to Duras, where Naum learned to play the violin. After that, together with Dimitar, Naum graduated from the Ioannina Greek High School and worked as his assistant-teacher. From 1841 to 1844 he studied at the Halki seminary, where he graduated in music and grammar. In 1843 he wrote a textbook on music and prepared a Greek grammar. After returning to Struga, Naum became involved in the activities of his brothers and became a proponent of the Bulgarian National Revival. Assists in collecting materials for the collection "Bulgarian Folk Songs". The folk songs collected by him are also notated. After 1878 he settled in the newly established Principality of Bulgaria. Naum received a national pension as a Bulgarian educator. He wrote a biography of his brothers, but failed to publish it. He died in 1897 in Sofia.

Significance 

The two brothers' educationalist activity and deaths ensured them a worthy place in the history of the Bulgarian cultural movement and the Bulgarian national liberation struggle in the 19th century. The brothers are known also for their keen interest in Bulgarian folk poetry as a result of which the collection "Bulgarian Folk Songs" appeared. The songs were collected between 1854 and 1860 mostly by the elder brother, Dimitar, who taught in several Macedonian towns (Ohrid, Struga, Prilep, Kukush and Bitola) and was able to put into writing the greater part of the 660 folk songs. The songs from the Sofia District were supplied by the Sofia schoolmaster Sava Filaretov. Those from Panagyurishte area, were recorded by Marin Drinov and Nesho Bonchev, but were sent by Vasil Cholakov. Rayko Zhinzifov, who went to Russia with the help of D. Miladinov, was another collaborator. Dimitar and Konstantin Miladinovi were aware of the great significance of the folklore in the period of the national revival and did their best to collect the best poetic writing which the Bulgarian people had created throughout the ages.

Their activity in this field is indicative of the growing interest shown towards folklore by the Bulgarian intelligentsia in the middle of the 19th century – by Vasil Aprilov, Nayden Gerov, Georgi Rakovski, Petko Slaveykov, etc. The collecting was highly assessed by its contemporaries - Lyuben Karavelov, Nesho Bonchev, Ivan Bogorov, Kuzman Shapkarev, Rayko Zhinzifov and others. The collection was met with great interest by foreign scholars. The Russian scholar Izmail Sreznevsky pointed out in 1863: "…It can be seen by the published collection that the Bulgarians far from lagging behind other peoples in poetic abilities even surpass them with the vitality of their poetry…" Soon parts of the collection were translated in Czech, Russian and German. Elias Riggs, an American linguist in Constantinople, translated nine songs into English and sent them to the American Oriental Society in Princeton, New Jersey. In a letter from in June 1862,  Riggs wrote: "…The whole present an interesting picture of the traditions and fancies prevailing among the mass of the Bulgarian people…"
The collection compiled by the Miladinov brothers also played a great role in the development of the modern Bulgarian literature, because its songs as poetic models for the outstanding Bulgarian poets – Ivan Vazov, Pencho Slaveikov, Kiril Hristov, Peyo Yavorov, etc.

Controversy

The Miladinov brothers were fervent proponents of the Bulgarian national idea in Macedonia and unequivocally identified as Bulgarians, referring to their language and culture exclusively as Bulgarian. Miladinov and other educated Macedonian Slavs then in fact worried that use of the designation Macedonian would imply an identification with the Greek nation. Nevertheless, their ethnicity, language, and legacy are a contentious political issue between Bulgaria and North Macedonia.

Per Alexis Heraclides, the Miladinov brothers were among "the earliest pioneers of a sense of Macedonian identity, as least as conceived by contemporary Macedonian historians and other scholars". The official view in North Macedonia is that the Miladinov brothers were in fact Macedonians who spoke Macedonian and contributed to Macedonian literature. However, the Miladinov brothers deliberately avoided using the term Macedonian in reference to the region, arguing that it presents a threat to the Bulgarian character of the population, and proposed the name Western Bulgaria instead.

After the conquest of the Balkans by the Ottomans, the name Macedonia disappeared as a designation for several centuries. Names such as "Lower Moesia" and "Lower Bulgaria" were used interchangeably by the region's Slavic population which had a clear Bulgarian ethnic consciousness. The name Macedonia was revived in the early 19th century with the new Greek state and was affirmed in the modern area as a result of Hellenic religious and school propaganda. In a private letter to Georgi Rakovski, Konstantin Miladinov expressed concern over the use of the name Macedonia as it may be used to justify Greek claims to the region and the local Bulgarian population, so he suggested that the region should be called Western Bulgaria instead.

In post-war Yugoslav Macedonia, the Miladinov brothers were appropriated by the historians as part of the Macedonian National Revival and their original works were hidden from the general public. Their works were claimed to be Macedonian, despite them stating in their works that they were Bulgarians.

Today in North Macedonia there are schools named after the Miladinov Brothers, but the pupils there do not have the access to the works of their schools' patrons in original. There is a similar case with the national museum of North Macedonia which, apparently, refuses to display original works by the two brothers, because of the Bulgarian labels on some of them.

Honour

 Miladinovi Islets near Livingston Island in the South Shetland Islands, Antarctica are named after the brothers.

See also

Struga Poetry Evenings

References

External links 
 Original edition of 'Bulgarian Folk Songs' 
 Full text of "Bulgarian folk songs" 
 Letter bearing the signature of Konstantin Miladinov
 Konstantin Miladinov poetry 
 official site of struga.org (English and Macedonian)

1810 births
1830 births
1862 deaths
People from Struga
Bulgarian educators
Bulgarian folklorists
Bulgarian male poets
Macedonia under the Ottoman Empire
19th-century Bulgarian people
Sibling duos
Literary families
Macedonian Bulgarians
Prisoners who died in Ottoman detention
Bulgarian people who died in prison custody
Deaths from typhus
19th-century Bulgarian poets
19th-century male writers

bg:Константин Миладинов